Pfennig (also Pfenning or Pfenninger) is a German surname. Notable people with the surname include:
 Frank Pfenning, professor of computer science
 Fritz Pfenninger
 Norbert Pfennig (1925–2008), German microbiologist
  (born 1944), German jazz musician, lyricist
  (1880–1963), German architect
  (1937–2008), German trade unionist

German-language surnames
Occupational surnames